American Association of Philosophy Teachers (AAPT) is a non-profit professional organization that supports the continuing professional development of philosophy teachers in North America. The association was established in 1976. AAPT publishes a newsletter, supports an online discussion forum, blogs, and the collection of teaching resources. Members also have online access to a fulltext collection of teaching related resources through the Philosophy Documentation Center.

Meetings
Every two years, AAPT sponsors the International Workshop-Conference on Teaching Philosophy at a different location in the U.S. or Canada. These conferences are open to philosophy teachers at every level. AAPT also sponsors sessions at divisional meetings of the American Philosophical Association.

External links 
AAPT website

Philosophical societies in the United States
Teacher associations based in the United States
1976 establishments in the United States